The IEEE/WIC/ACM '''International Joint Conference on Web Intelligence and Intelligent Agent Technology (WI-IAT)''' is a colocated conference focusing on Web intelligence and Intelligent Agent Technology.  The conference is a joint undertaking of the Institute of Electrical and Electronics Engineers (IEEE) Computer Society Technical Committee on Intelligent Informatics (TCII), the Web Intelligence Consortium (WIC), SIGAI, and the Memetic Computing Society.

See also
ACM 
ACM SIGAI
IEEE
IEEE Computer Society
Memetic Computing Society

References
Web releate

Computer science conferences